Thomas Elliott Stewart (September 22, 1824 – January 9, 1904) was a U.S. Representative from New York.

Biography
Born in New York City, Stewart completed preparatory studies, studied law, was admitted to the bar in 1847 and commenced practice in New York City.

He served as a member of the board of education in 1854. He was a member of the New York State Assembly (New York Co., 7th D.) in 1865 and 1866. He served as a member of the Republican State committee from 1866 to 1868.

Stewart was elected as a Conservative Republican to the 40th Congress, defeating a Radical Republican and a Democrat. He served one term, March 4, 1867, to March 3, 1869, and did not run for reelection in 1868. While in Congress, Stewart voted against the impeachment of Andrew Johnson.

After leaving Congress, Stewart resumed the practice of law, and later became involved with the Liberal Republicans, serving as chairman of the party's New York City general committee in 1872.

From 1874 to 1876 Stewart was a member of the New York City Park Commission.

Death and burial
He died in New York City on January 9, 1904, and was interred at Center Cemetery in New Milford, Connecticut.

Family
In 1854 Stewart married Harriet Allen Taylor, daughter of a prominent New Milford physician and Democratic politician who served in the Connecticut House of Representatives and Connecticut State Senate. They were the parents of two sons, George Taylor Stewart and Thomas E. Stewart, Jr.

Sources

Thomas E. Stewart's Funeral; Services Over ex-Congressman Held at New Milford, Conn.  New York Times, January 13, 1904

1824 births
1904 deaths
New York (state) lawyers
New York (state) Liberal Republicans
Members of the New York State Assembly
Republican Party members of the United States House of Representatives from New York (state)
Burials in Connecticut
19th-century American politicians